Martinsburg station is a railway station in Martinsburg, West Virginia, United States, served by MARC Brunswick Line commuter rail service and Amtrak  intercity rail service. The station has one side platform serving a siding track of the CSX Cumberland Subdivision, with a footbridge crossing the siding and the two main tracks to provide access to the preserved Baltimore and Ohio Railroad Martinsburg Shops complex.

History

Martinsburg station is a restored 1848-1876 railroad hotel and its sympathetic modern train station addition at 229 East Martin Street in Martinsburg. It is also a contributing property to the Baltimore and Ohio and Related Industries Historic District. The building is among the oldest surviving railroad stations in the United States.

The station has seen many historic events. In 1862, the hotel witnessed the destruction of the B&O Roundhouses and shops by General Stonewall Jackson, and the following year General Robert E. Lee's army retreated through Martinsburg two blocks west following the Battle of Gettysburg. The Great Railroad Strike of 1877, the first national labor strike, began here. The station is also the portal to the state's first Civil War Trail.

Station layout
The station is not compliant with the Americans with Disabilities Act of 1990.

References

External links

Martinsburg Amtrak-MARC Station (USA Rail Guide -- Train Web)

1848 establishments in Virginia
Amtrak stations in West Virginia
Brunswick Line
Buildings and structures in Martinsburg, West Virginia
Historic American Engineering Record in West Virginia
MARC Train stations
Railway hotels in the United States
Railway stations in West Virginia
Former Baltimore and Ohio Railroad stations
Transportation in Berkeley County, West Virginia
Bus stations in West Virginia
National Register of Historic Places in Martinsburg, West Virginia